Qadamgah-e Emam Reza (also Romanized as Qadamgāh-e Emām Rez̤ā) is a village in Howmeh Rural District, in the Central District of Behbahan County, Khuzestan Province, Iran. At the 2006 census, its population was 61, in 14 families.

References 

Populated places in Behbahan County